Beller is a surname. Notable people with the surname include:

 Bryan Beller, bass guitarist, known for his work with Mike Keneally, Steve Vai, Dethklok, and Dweezil Zappa
 Hava Kohav Beller, filmmaker known for two documentary films: The Restless Conscience (1991), and The Burning Wall (2002)
 Kathleen Beller (born 1956), American actress nominated for a Golden Globe Award for Best Motion Picture Actress
 Marty Beller, the current drummer for They Might Be Giants
 Mary Linn Beller (1933-2000), American child actress.
 Thomas Beller (born 1965), American author and editor
 William Beller (1900–1986), classical pianist and longtime teacher of piano at Columbia University

See also
 John Bellers (1654–1725), English educational theorist and Quaker